Gilbert Anthony Milam Jr. (born October 27, 1983), better known by his stage name Berner, is an American rapper and entrepreneur signed to Wiz Khalifa's Taylor Gang Entertainment. He has released over 40 albums, several of which have charted on Billboards "Top R&B/Hip-Hop Albums" chart. As an entrepreneur, he created the Cookies brand of cannabis products and clothing gear that formed out of San Francisco in the early 2010s. The company has grown to include dozens of dispensaries across the United States and abroad, along with multiple clothing stores.

Early life 
A Sunset District native, Berner attended Galileo Academy of Science and Technology before dropping out. His mother was an office worker and his father was a chef at a Mexican restaurant on Fillmore Street. When Berner was 13, the family moved to Arizona, where his father planned to open a restaurant. During high school, Berner began battle rapping and in 2006 he released his first mixtape, Dirty Sneakers...Plenty Ways to Get It.

Musical career 

After forming his own label, Bern One Entertainment in 2007, Berner  released his debut album, Track Money & Pack Money, with Equipto. His first solo album, Weekend at Bernie's arrived in 2009, along with four other albums.

In March 2012, Berner signed to Wiz Khalifa's Taylor Gang Records. Urban Farmer, Berner's first collection to be released on Taylor Gang Records, was released on October 2, 2012. In 2013, Berner embarked performed on the "Under the Influence of Music Tour" alongside Khalifa, A$AP Rocky, Trinidad Jame$ and Joey Bada$$. In 2015, Berner released Contraband, a collaborative album with Cam'ron, as well as Drought Season 3 with deceased rapper The Jacka. In 2016, Berner released the solo album Hempire, also producing a 4/20 show at the Bill Graham Civic Auditorium with a lineup that included Cypress Hill, Juicy J, Dizzy Wright, J Boog, Kool John, and Berner.

Urban Farmer, another of Berner's albums, features Iamsu! from The HBK Gang on two tracks; and the Jacka, Rydah J. Klyde and San Quinn on 21 Gunz.

Berner's single, 20 Lights reached number 95 on the Billboard 200 chart. It was released on January 6, 2015. "Best Thang Smokin" is the lead single in Berner's album Hempire, released April 1, 2016.

On May 4, 2019, he released the album El Chivo.

Cookies cannabis brand
At age 18, Berner got a job working at a San Francisco cannabis dispensary named The Hemp Center. In the early 2000s, he formed a relationship with underground cultivator Jai Chang (a.k.a. "Jigga"), who developed a strain of cannabis named "Girl Scout Cookies". Berner and Chang began selling the strain to dispensaries (along with other strains developed by Chang), opting to name their brand "Cookies" after receiving a cease-and-desist letter from the Girl Scouts of America. Berner also sold the strains to friends, including rapper Wiz Khalifa who he was introduced to in 2010. Khalifa soon began mentioning Cookies in his rap songs, while Berner wore clothing bearing a Cookies logo in music videos that he appeared in. Berner went on to develop a line of Cookies clothing wear and opened his first Cookies clothing store in San Francisco in 2015. The first Cookies cannabis dispensary followed in 2018, followed by the first on the East Coast opening in 2021. By 2022 the number of dispensaries had grown to 49, to go along with clothing stores in San Francisco, Los Angeles, and New York.

In August 2022, Berner was the first cannabis executive to be featured on the cover of Forbes Magazine since it launched in 1917. Forbes conservatively estimated the Cookies brand to be worth $150 million.

Personal life
Berner was diagnosed with stage 3 colon cancer in 2021, but it went into remission after chemotherapy.

He has a daughter.

Discography

Solo albums 
Dirty Sneakers... Plenty Ways to Get It (2007)
Weekend at Bernie's (2009)
The White Album (2011)
Urban Farmer (2012)
Drugstore Cowboy (2013)
20 Lights EP (2015) – US Billboard 200 No. 95
Hempire (2016) – US Billboard 200 No. 54
Packs (2016)
Berner (DJ Michael Watts Swisha House Remix) (2016)
Sleepwalking (2017)
The Big Pescado (2018)
RICO (2018)
11/11 (2018)
Drugstore Cowboy (DJ Michael Watts Swisha House Remix) (2019)
El Chivo (2019)
La Plaza (2019)
Russ Bufalino: The Quiet Don (2020)
Paulie Cicero (2021)
Gotti (2021)
From Seed to Sale (2022) – US Billboard 200 No. 20

Collaboration albums 
2007: Track Money & Pack Money (with Equipto)
2008: Drought Season (with The Jacka)
2009: Demolition Men Presents: Duffle Bag Money (with Equipto)
2009: Drought Season 2 (with The Jacka)
2009: Blow (with Messy Marv)
2009: Traffic (with Ampichino)
2010: Traffic 2: Trains Planes & Automobiles (with Ampichino)
2010: Blow (Blocks & Boat Docks) (with Messy Marv)
2012: Border Wars (with The Jacka)
2013: Cookies & Cream (with San Quinn)
2014: Prohibition (with B-Real)
2015: Drought Season 3 (with The Jacka)
2015: Harvest Season (with Liqz)
2015: Prohibition Part 2 (with B-Real)
2015: Contraband EP (with Cam'ron)
2016: Prohibition Part 3 (with B-Real)
2016: Public Enemies (with Lil Evil & Aftah Sum)
2016: Guilty By Association 2: Criminal Enterprise (with Rich Rocka aka Ya Boy & San Quinn)
2017: Vibes (with Styles P)
2017: Tracking Numbers EP (with Young Dolph)
2018: Terra Firma EP (with Omni Alien)
2019: Slimey Individualz (with Mozzy)
2019: Pheno Grigio (with Curren$y)
2020: Los Meros (with B-Real)
2020: The Warning (with R-MEAN)
2020: Cooks & Orange Juice EP (with Larry June)
2020: Respect The Connect (with Cozmo)
2021: They Land Better In Manchester EP (with Tunde)

Compilations 
2010: The Best Of Goldtoes & Berner
2014: Dirty Money Compilation (Volume 1)
2017: Dirty Money Compilation (Volume 2)
2017: Dirty Money Compilation (Volume 2) (Chopped Not Slopped)

Singles 
2008: Purp (Remix) With The Jacka
2009: Got Work – Feat Bun B
2010: This Love Feat Supa Sag
2011: Flyn Feat Homewrecka & Smiggz
2011: Dirty
2011: Yoko Feat Wiz Khalifa & Big Krit
2011: Day Dreamin'''2011: Yoko (Remix) Feat Wiz Khalifa & Big Krit & Chris Brown2012: Exhale Feat Cozmo2012: No Handcuffs Feat Chevy Woods2013: Vega (Freestyle)2013: Wide Open Feat Project Pat2013: Goodstock – Berner, Chevy Woods & Tuki Carter2013: If I Don't Gotta Feat Freeze & Smiggz2013: Paradise Feat Wiz Khalifa2013: Me & You Feat Suga Free2013: All In With San Quinn Feat Baldhead Rick2013:  Fly Away With San Quinn Feat Equipto2013: Get High2013: Working Girl2013: That's How The $ Money Came2013: Get High (Remix) Feat Designer D, Strae Bullet, Nit Da Pit2013: Don't Stop Feat Gage Gully2013: Home Of The Cookies Feat Anonymous That Dude2014: Dirty Money2014: Chapo Feat Wiz Khalifa2014: Dizzy2014: 20 Joints2014: Trippin' (Freestyle)2014: So Much Joy Feat Anonymous That Dude2014: Thru2014: Mess2014: Check Talk Feat Slicc Pulla2014: All In A Day Feat YG, Young Thug, Vital2014: Everything Everything – Berner, Wiz Khalifa, Iamsu!, JR Donato & Kool John2014: Sell It All (Freestyle)2015: Still I Ride2015: Money First With Dinero G Feat Lucky Luciano2015: Street Money (Freestyle)2015: Mind Blown Feat Anonymous That Dude2015: Murda Murda With Paul Wall & Demrick2015: Foreign Feat Keak Da Sneak, Sage The Gemini, Snow Tha Product2015: Lifetime2015: 100 P's (Part 2)2015: Dopeboy Dance Feat Nef The Pharaoh & Dyce2015: Why Wait? With Camron Feat Wiz Khalifa & 2 Chainz2016: Changes Feat Mistah FAB2016: On My Own (Freestyle)2016: Gun Play (Remix) Feat Wiz Khalifa & Hollywood2017: Deep Thoughts Feat AG Cubano & Don Chino2017: Hello Feat Jimmy Da Butcher2018: Light Show Feat Kevin Gates2019: Cookies In A Bag (Remix) Feat San Quinn, Swinla, Young Boo2019: Ima Hustla With Prodkt & Louie Loc2020: No Mids Feat G-Mainey''

References

External links 

Taylor Gang profile

1983 births
Living people
21st-century American male musicians
21st-century American rappers
American male rappers
American rappers of Mexican descent
Businesspeople in the cannabis industry
Hispanic and Latino American rappers
Rappers from California
Rappers from San Francisco
West Coast hip hop musicians